Karadeniz Holding is a Turkish energy company which owns and operates land based power plants and powerships, through its subsidiary Karpowership. It is based in Istanbul, Turkey. The company is operational in several industries, including energy, finance, ship building, and real estate.

Ships operated by Karpowership
 Doğan Bey (2010) 
 Rauf Bey (2010)
 Kaya Bey (2011)
 Alican Bey (2011) 
 İrem Sultan (2012) 
 Fatmagül Sultan (2013)
 Orhan Bey (2013)  
 Esra Sultan (2015) 
 Zeynep Sultan (2015)
 Osman Khan (2016)
 Onur Sultan (2016)
 Gökhan Bey (2016)
 Yasin Bey (2016)
 Mehmet Bey (2018)
 Nezih Bey (2018)
 Koray Bey (2018)
 Baris Bey (2019)

References

Holding companies of Turkey
1996 establishments in Turkey
Holding companies established in 1996
Energy companies established in 1996
Turkish brands
Powerships
Companies based in Istanbul